Naum Panovski (born July 3, 1950 in Skopje, Republic of Macedonia) is a professional theatre director and writer. He graduated 1973 from the Academy for Theatre, Film, Radio, and Television in Belgrade and made his directorial debut that same year at the Dramski Teatar Dramatic Theatre in Skopje. He also holds a Master of Science Degree in Dramatic Arts from the University of Belgrade Faculty of Dramatic Arts, and a Ph.D. in the Humanities – Aesthetics of Theatre Directing, from the University of Texas in Dallas, United States.

During his professional career in theatre he has worked as a director or a dramaturge on more than seventy productions produced and performed in theatres in Bosnia, Croatia, Slovenia, Serbia, Macedonia, Italy, Russia, Bulgaria, Turkey, Poland, France, and the United States.

His books on theater include, Theatre as a Weapon, published in 1991 by Kultura Publishing from Skopje, Macedonia, and Directing Poiesis, published by Peter Lang Publishing from New York City 1993. Directing Poiesis addresses directly the art of theatre directing and explores its relevance from both theoretical, aesthetic, and practical perspective.

As a theatre critic and theorist he has contributed numerous articles to various publications, participated on panels and symposia, and served on boards and in other artistic leadership positions.

His work was inspired by the theories and practices of experimental theatre of Adolphe Appia, Vsevolod Meyerhold, Bertolt Brecht, Antonin Artaud, Peter Brook, Joseph Chaikin, Richard Scheckner, Tadeush Kantor, Carl Weber, Robert Corrigan, Mata Miloshevich, and Mira Miocinovic.

His recent production of Uncle Maroje by Marin Držić, was met with high acclaim and standing ovations at the internationally renowned  Dubrovnik Summer Festival in Croatia.

He is currently Artistic Director of Poiesis Theatre Project.

List of Theatre Productions (Chronological Partial List)
 Uncle Maroje by Marin Drzic, Dubrovnik Summer Festival, Dubrovnik, Croatia, July 2004
 Uncle Maroje by Marin Drzic, Hartke Theatre, Catholic University of America. Washington, D.C. April 2004
 Three Tall Women by Edward Albee, Catholic University of America. Washington, DC. 2001
 Mud by Maria Irene Fornes Dubrovnik 2001
 Trojan Women by Euripides. Washington. 2001
 Everyman by Anonymous. Washington. 2000
 Crucible by Arthur Miller. University of the Arts. Philadelphia. 1999
 Mud by Maria Irene Fornes. Skopje. 1988
 Glass Menagerie by Tennessee Williams. Christopher Newport University, Newport News. 1997
 Inspector General by Nikolai Gogol. Christopher Newport University, Newport News. 1997
 Phaedra by Robert Arthur. Christopher Newport University, Newport News. 1996
 Hamlet by William Shakespeare. Christopher Newport University, Newport News. 1995
 Sarajevo by Goran Stefanovski. Undermain Theatre, Dallas, TX. 1995
 Fable by Jean Claude van Itallie. Christopher Newport University, Newport News. 1994
 Eastern Diwan by Dzevad Karahasan. Bitola. 1990
 R by Jordan Plevnes. Banja Luka. 1990
 Metastabile Grail by Nenad Prokic. Banja Luka. 1986
 Hawthorn Tree by Bratislav Dimitrov. Skopje. 1985
 Anera by Ivo Bresan. Dubrovnik. 1983
 Crnila (Darkness) by Kole Casule.	Stip. 1983
 Memet by Irfan Bellur. Skopje. 1981
 Hi-Fi by Goran Stefanovski. Kumanovo
 The Effect of Gamma Rays on Man-In-the-Moon Marigolds by Paul Zingel, Dramski Teatar Skopje, Skopje, Macedonia. May 1973

References

External links
Naum Panovski Official Website

Macedonian theatre directors
Writers from Skopje
Living people
1950 births
University of Texas at Dallas alumni
University of Belgrade Faculty of Dramatic Arts alumni